Prays inscripta is a moth of the  family Plutellidae. It is found in the Australian states of New South Wales and Victoria.

External links
Australian Faunal Directory

Plutellidae
Moths described in 1907